Beniarrés is a municipality in the comarca of Comtat in the Valencian Community, Spain.

References

Municipalities in the Province of Alicante
Comtat